Shah Makhdum Airport  is a domestic airport serving Rajshahi, the principal city of the Rajshahi Division in Bangladesh. The airport is named after Sufi saint Shah Makhdum Rupos. The airport also serves as a base for two flying training academy.

Facilities

ON 17 November 2022, Novoair became the first airline in the country to operate inter-city flight other than Dhaka, connecting Rajshahi with Cox's Bazar.

Airlines and destinations

Incidents and accidents
 25 April 2013: A 2-seater Cessna 152 (S2-ABI), a flight training aircraft of Bangladesh Flying Academy crash landed in the airport, while landing in the airport on 4:24 pm. The aircraft flipped upside-down; the flight instructor and trainee pilot inside escaped with minor injuries.
 1 April 2015: Another Cessna 152 (S2-ADI) aircraft of Bangladesh Flying Academy crashed at the airport and got engulfed by fire after the pilot conducted a rejected takeoff, sensing technical problems on the aircraft at around 2 pm. The accident left the trainee pilot dead, also leaving the flight instructor with critical burn injuries. After some time, the flight instructor also died.

See also
List of airports in Bangladesh
Shah Makhdum Rupos

References

External links

 Civil Aviation Authority of Bangladesh: Airports
 

Airports in Bangladesh
Rajshahi